Something Else or Somethin' Else may refer to:

Music

Performers
 Something Else (Japanese band), a folk band
 Somethin' Else!, an American band featuring Bobby Cochran
 Something Else, a 1970s Scottish band featuring Sheena Easton

Albums
 Something Else!!!!, by Ornette Coleman, 1958
 Something Else (The Brian Jonestown Massacre album), 2018
 Somethin' Else (Cannonball Adderley album), or the title song, written by Miles Davis, 1958
 Something Else (The Cranberries album), 2017
 Somethin' Else (The Kingston Trio album), 1965
 Something Else (Robin Thicke album), 2008
 Something Else (Shirley Bassey album), 1971
 Something Else (Tech N9ne album), 2013
 Something Else by The Kinks, 1967
 Something Else from The Move, 1968
 Something Else, by Elom Adablah, 2012

Songs
 "Somethin' Else" (song), by Eddie Cochran, 1959
 "Something Else", by Diamond Rings from Special Affections, 2010
 "Something Else", by the Doubleclicks from Lasers and Feelings, 2013
 "Something Else", by Gary Jules from Trading Snakeoil for Wolftickets, 2001
 "Something Else", by Good Charlotte from Good Morning Revival, 2007

Television
 Something Else (TV series), a 1978–1982 British youth-aimed programme
 Something Else, a 1970–1971 American musical variety television show hosted by John Byner
 Something Else, a 2001 Canadian children's animated television show

Other uses
 Something Else (book), a 1994 children's book by Kathryn Cave
 Somethin' Else (content agency), a British multi-platform content company
 Something Else Press, an American small-press publisher

See also
 Something (disambiguation)